The Fox Islands consist of the North Fox and South Fox islands, in Lake Michigan. The three islands form part of an archipelago. South Fox Island Light was built in 1867 and operated until 1959. Both islands are part of Leelanau County, Michigan, and are administered by Leelanau Township. Several shipwrecks have occurred on the Fox Islands, or the reefs adjoining them; in 1851, the Illinois was reported as a "total wreck" on the Fox Island reef, In 1860, the bark Fontanelle ran aground at the Fox Islands, and in 1861, the schooner Nightingale. In 1873, the ships Frank Perew and Magnet encountered trouble at the Fox Islands.

North Fox Island 

This island was purchased by real estate magnate David V. Johnson in 1994 for $1.3 million, and the entire island was sold back to the state of Michigan for $2.2 million at the end of the year 2000. The island is currently operated as part of the Beaver Islands State Wildlife Research Area.

North Fox Island has an operational public 3,000-foot-long by 100-foot-wide turf airstrip as of 8/2015, making it accessible by general aviation.  Airport designation is 6Y3. This runway is unsealed.

In the 1970s, a child pornography ring was discovered operating on North Fox Island. The proprietor of the island, Francis Shelden, with help from Dyer Grossman, Adam Starchild, and Gerald Richards, created a fraudulent charity they named Brother Paul's Children's Mission as a cover to fly boys in Shelden's private plane to his island retreat. The Detroit Free Press published a feature story in their weekend magazine on Shelden and the island, then published a second story when the crimes were uncovered. The crimes have long been suspected to have ties to the Oakland County Child Killer case.

South Fox Island 

As of 2001, David V. Johnson also owned about two-thirds of South Fox. The other third was owned by the state of Michigan, including the two lighthouses on the southern tip of the island. There is no ferry service to South Fox, and it has no docks, fuel or sheltered harbor. However, a private airport with a  private runway can accommodate jet aircraft.

Two generations of the South Fox Island Light stand at the southern extremity of the island. The first, built in 1867, is a brick house with attached tower; the second, a skeletal tower, is the former Sapelo Island Light, which was moved to the site in 1934. The Fox Island Lighthouse Association (FILA), a non-profit organization, was formed in 2004 to aid in preservation of the light station structures.

Johnson built a paved runway and a residence on the southern island; the runway is about 1600 metres long. This deal was finalized in March 2003.

South Fox Island boasts some of the most spectacular freshwater maritime scenery in the world, including towering dunes, virgin cedars, and untouched beaches.

The island includes a cemetery where members of the Grand Traverse Band of Native Americans are currently buried. These islands are historically important for the three federally recognized tribes of Odawa peoples in Michigan, the Grand Traverse Band, the Little River Band of Ottawa Indians and the Little Traverse Bay Bands of Odawa Indians. 

Deer were introduced onto the island in 1915. Hunting is permitted on state land.

Indigenous Name of Fox Islands 
There are three federally recognized tribes of Odawa peoples in Michigan, the Grand Traverse Band, the Little River Band of Ottawa Indians and the Little Traverse Bay Bands of Odawa Indians. These tribes are also known as Anishinaabeg (adjectival: Anishinaabe) and are a group of culturally related indigenous peoples present in the Great Lakes region of Canada and the United States. They include the Ojibwe (including Saulteaux and Oji-Cree), Odawa, Potawatomi, Mississaugas, Nipissing and Algonquin peoples. The Anishinaabe speak Anishinaabemowin, or Anishinaabe languages that belong to the Algonquian language family. 

The Anishinaabe people that live in and around Harbor Springs, Michigan, have a long history of occupation of the land in northern Michigan. From this history and engagement with their land comes cultural stories that have been recorded by Jane Willetts Ettawageshik. These Anishinaabe stories speak of how the Anishinaabe people related to their land, to their people, and various other means of communicating their values, outlooks and histories. Jane Willetts Ettawageshik recorded various stories in Odawa of the Odawa peoples in northern Michigan. These stories have been translated into a book "Ottawa Stories from the Springs, Anishinaabe dibaadjimowinan wodi gaa binjibaamigak wodi mookodjiwong e zhinikaadek" by Howard Webkamigad.

One such story is “Anishinaabe ikwewizens miinawaa do animookaadjiinmon / The Story of the Young Anishinaabe Woman and Her Dog”. This story tells of a young Anishinaabe woman who comes of age and is told to seek her sacred vision. After 10 days, she comes back to the village knowing her sacred vision and eventually the young woman runs away with her dog. The young woman finds an abandoned island and mates with her dog and has dog/human hybrid children. Eventually, some Anishinaabe warriors come across her island finding the woman, her spouse-dog and their dog/human children. The Anishinaabe warriors go back to their village and tell the woman’s older brother about his sister. The brother goes and kills his sister and her family. The Anishinaabe outlaw animal / human marriage because of this woman as well as name two islands after the woman and her dog husband, animookaadjiinon, though the name has been changed in English to North and South Fox Island s.

References

Notes

Citations

Further reading
 "A Tour of the Lights of the Straits." Michigan History 70 (Sep/Oct 1986), pp. 17–29.

External links

Beacons in the Night, Michigan Lighthouse Chronology, Clarke Historical Library, Central Michigan University.
Lighthouses in the Mackinac Straits.
Interactive map of Lights in Northern Lake Michigan, mapped by Google.
Terry Pepper, Seeing the Light, South Fox Island Lighthouse.
North Fox Island and South Fox Island: Blocks 2000 and 2001, Census Tract 9701, Leelanau County, Michigan United States Census Bureau

Islands of Leelanau County, Michigan
Uninhabited islands of Michigan
Islands of Lake Michigan in Michigan